Timmy T. Davis is an American diplomat and former Marine who is the United States ambassador to Qatar.

Early life and education 

A native of Virginia, Davis attended the University of Alabama and the University of Southern Mississippi. He considers New Orleans his hometown. He served in the United States Marine Corps for nearly a decade, including operations in the Horn of Africa and Iraq, before joining the Foreign Service. Davis speaks Spanish and Arabic.

Davis' father and mother are from Mississippi. His father is a retired U.S. Marine Master Gunnery Sergeant.  Davis' younger sister, brother-in-law, and two of his uncles are all U.S. Marines.  His older sister is a research nurse. He graduated from Lejeune High School at Camp Lejeune, N.C., though he grew up on a number of Marine Corps bases on the eastern seaboard.

Career 

Davis, a career member of the Senior Foreign Service with the rank of Counselor, has had an extensive career as a diplomat and official with the State Department. He most recently served as the Executive Assistant to the Secretary of State. Prior to that, Davis served as the U.S. Consul General for Basrah and Southern Iraq, where he led the eventual suspension of operations. His domestic assignments include senior watch officer in the State Department Operations Center, Special Assistant to the secretary of state, Director for Iraq at the National Security Council, Deputy Chief of Staff to the Special Presidential Envoy to the Global Coalition to Counter the Islamic State of Iraq and the Levant, Senior Advisor to the counselor of the United States Department of State, Chief of Staff to the undersecretary for political affairs, and acting Chief of Staff of the State Department. Davis is a Political Officer. His overseas tours include Guatemala City, Guatemala; Najaf, Iraq; Canberra, Australia; and Bogotá, Colombia. Davis was a party mentioned in the Hillary Clinton email controversy.

Ambassador to Qatar
On March 18, 2022, President Joe Biden announced his intent to nominate Davis to be the next United States Ambassador to Qatar. On March 30, 2022, his nomination was sent to the Senate. Hearings on his nomination were held before the Senate Foreign Relations Committee on June 16, 2022. The committee favorably reported his nomination to the Senate floor on June 23, 2022. His nomination was confirmed by the full Senate via voice vote on August 4, 2022. He presented his credentials to Amir Sheikh Tamim bin Hamad Al Thani on September 13, 2022.

Awards and recognition 

Davis has received a number of awards including the Distinguished Honor Award and multiple Superior and Meritorious Honor awards. He is also the recipient of the State Department's Ryan C. Crocker Award for Outstanding Leadership in Expeditionary Diplomacy, and the American Foreign Service Association’s William R. Rivkin Award for Constructive Dissent.

Personal life
Davis speaks Spanish and Arabic.

See also
Ambassadors of the United States

References

Living people
Place of birth missing (living people)
Year of birth missing (living people)
20th-century American diplomats
21st-century American diplomats
African-American diplomats
United States Department of State officials
United States Foreign Service personnel
United States Marines
Ambassadors of the United States to Qatar